Soccer-specific stadium is a term used mainly in the United States and Canada to refer to a sports stadium either purpose-built or fundamentally redesigned for soccer and whose primary function is to host soccer matches, as opposed to a multi-purpose stadium which is for a variety of sports. A soccer-specific stadium may host other sporting events (such as lacrosse, American football and rugby) and concerts, but the design and purpose of a soccer-specific stadium is primarily for soccer. Some facilities (for example SeatGeek Stadium, Toyota Stadium and Historic Crew Stadium) have a permanent stage at one end of the stadium used for staging concerts.

A soccer-specific stadium typically has amenities, dimensions and scale suitable for soccer in North America, including a scoreboard, video screen, luxury suites and possibly a roof. The playing surface typically consists of grass as opposed to artificial turf, as the latter is generally disfavored for soccer matches since players are more susceptible to injuries. However, some soccer specific stadiums, such as Portland's Providence Park and Creighton University's Morrison Stadium, do have artificial turf.

The seating capacity is generally between 18,000 and 30,000 for a Major League Soccer franchise, or smaller for college or minor league soccer teams. This is in comparison to the much larger American football stadiums that mostly range between 60,000 and 80,000 in which the original North American Soccer League teams played and most MLS teams occupied during the league's inception. As opposed to gridiron-style football stadiums, where the front row of seats is elevated several feet above the field of play to allow spectators to see over the heads of substitute players and coaches on the sidelines, soccer-specific venues typically have the front row closer to the level of the pitch.

History

In the 1980s and 1990s, first-division professional soccer leagues in the United States, such as the North American Soccer League and Major League Soccer, primarily used American football fields, many of which were oversized in terms of seating capacity and undersized in terms of the width of the soccer field; they often used artificial turf (none of which, at the time, were approved for international soccer under FIFA rules). Although many of the baseball parks had smaller capacities, natural grass, and a wider field, these parks were generally in use during summer, when North American–based soccer leagues, such as Major League Soccer, also hold their seasons, and the irregular field dimensions and sightlines were often considered undesirable.

Soccer-specific stadiums first came into use in the 1990s, after the multi-purpose stadium era.

The term "soccer-specific stadium" was coined by Lamar Hunt, who financed the construction of the Columbus Crew Stadium, the first soccer-specific stadium constructed specifically for Major League Soccer. In the 2000s, other Major League Soccer teams in the United States began constructing their own stadiums. Canada's first soccer-specific stadium was BMO Field in Toronto, home to Toronto FC. This stadium was renovated to accommodate Canadian football for the 2016 and subsequent seasons. The distinction is less prominent in Canada, where MLS's attendance figures are comparable to those of the domestic Canadian Football League, and the CFL's wider field means fewer compromises must be made to accommodate both; Tim Hortons Field was built purposely to both soccer specifications and CFL regulations. Of the three Canadian cities that host both MLS and CFL teams, only one (Montreal) has separate stadiums for each.

Major League Soccer (MLS)

Current MLS soccer-specific stadiums

Other proposals

Vancouver Whitecaps FC had planned to construct a soccer-specific waterfront stadium as part of their MLS expansion in 2011, but later announced that they would commit to playing at BC Place Stadium, which it shares with other teams and events.

National Women's Soccer League (NWSL)

Current NWSL soccer-specific stadiums

Under construction

United Soccer League (USL)

Current USLC and USL1 soccer-specific stadiums
All USL Championship teams and USL League One teams will be required to play in self-owned, soccer-specific stadiums by the 2022 season. The following is a list of current USL stadiums that are soccer-specific stadiums:

Stadiums under construction

Proposed USL soccer-specific stadiums

NCAA (Division I)

Other soccer-specific stadiums

Past soccer-specific stadiums

Other countries

The term "football-specific stadium" is sometimes used in countries where the sport is known as football rather than soccer, although the term is not common in countries where football is the dominant sport and thus football-specific stadiums are quite common. The term tends to have a slightly different meaning in these countries, usually referring to a stadium without an athletics track surrounding the field. Some soccer stadiums in Europe are also used for other sports, including rugby, American football, and field hockey. The problem with oversized stadiums designed for another sport is particularly visible in European American football leagues and conflicts between teams sharing the stadium (a notable example are Eintracht Braunschweig and the Braunschweig Lions which share a stadium) and (often municipal) owners of the stadiums sometimes arise, leading to attempts at single sport-specific venues.

See also
 List of soccer stadiums in the United States
 List of soccer stadiums in Canada
 List of football (soccer) stadiums by capacity
 List of Major League Soccer stadiums
 List of NASL stadiums
 List of National Women's Soccer League stadiums
 List of Women's Professional Soccer stadiums

Notes

References

 

Association football venues
Association football terminology
Soccer
Lists of soccer stadiums in Canada
 Specific
Stadiums